Troglohyphantes similis, one of several species occasionally called the Kočevje subterranean spider is a species of spider in the family Linyphiidae. It is endemic to Slovenia.

References

Linyphiidae
Spiders of Europe
Endemic fauna of Slovenia
Taxonomy articles created by Polbot
Spiders described in 1919